Georgi Amzin (Bulgarian: Георги Амзин; born 2 March 1992) is a Bulgarian footballer who plays as a midfielder for Vitosha Bistritsa.

References

External links
 

1992 births
Living people
Bulgarian footballers
PFC CSKA Sofia players
Akademik Sofia players
FC Vitosha Bistritsa players
First Professional Football League (Bulgaria) players
Association football midfielders